Helhoek may refer to:

 Helhoek, South Holland
 Helhoek, Gelderland